The Enviate Hypercar  is a racing car built by the LoveFab Race Team, competing for the Pikes Peak International Hill Climb event.

Nomenclature 
The use of NSX components and a V8 engine was the inspiration for the name.

The name Enviate was formed with modified pronunciations of the letters N and V, and the number 8. V and 8 come from the V8 engine, whilst the N is from the NSX. All three create the pronunciations en, vee, and eit, which are then loosely modified to create the name.

Overview

1st generation (2013) 
In 2013, the car was unveiled, and was known as Enviate v1.0. The car's body was built with NSX components and lightweight material. No other information is known about the car.

The car went through minimal testing, until it was ultimately ended after a crash that occurred in the same year.

2nd generation (2013-present) 
A new car was in development after the original Enviate's crash, called the Enviate Hypercar. The car is a new ground-up build, utilizing F1 engineers from around the globe. The car's power is driven by a Porsche H-type gearbox. Suspension is a double A-armed, pushrod suspension.

The car's downforce is the second highest ever made for a racing car, behind the F1-competing Red Bull RB6 race car, in which it made  of downforce. The Aero package was built by Affinity Aero, via F1 level cfd engineering.

The car also uses carbon discs for braking, which is stronger than carbon ceramic brakes.

Racing history

2013 
The Enviate v1.0 was scheduled to race in the 2013 Pikes Peak International Hill Climb, until it was eventually cancelled, after a crash had occurred that basically destroyed the car. Fortunately, the core of the car was still intact, which meant development of a new Enviate could be done whilst using the same parts as before. This also forced the Enviate to stay out of Pikes Peak competition for four whole years.

2017 
A new Enviate Hypercar was complete, which meant it was ready to race in Pikes Peak competition. The car finally made its debut, in the 2017 Broadmoor Pikes Peak International Hill Climb, competing in the Unlimited classification. The Enviate's main target was against Romain Dumas and the Norma M20 RD, but the car did not post a faster lap time.

References 

Racing cars